Candico, based in Delhi, India, started their operations in 1997, and now is the largest confectionery companies in India. It has operations in 19 countries and an annual turnover of US$ 59 million.

Products
Candico make confectionery, in the following categories:
 Toffees: centre filled, centre not filled, éclairs
 Candies: centre filled, centre not filled
 Gums: bricks, balls, sticks, chewing gum
 Soft Chews: aerated, not aerated
 Compressed powder tablets

Manufacturing
With manufacturing facilities in India, Tanzania and South Africa, Candico (ISO 9001-2000, HACCP Certified & FDA approved) owns India's largest integrated confectionery manufacturing facility.

The plant has a production capacity of 45,000 tonnes.

The equipment has been sourced from vendors in Europe including Togum, France; AMP Rose, United Kingdom and BWI Manesty, UK.

Contract manufacturing
Candico is engaged in contract manufacturing / private labeling for international and Indian companies. Candico provides complete solutions for its clients, from gum base and flavors to primary and secondary packing materials.

Most clients are located in Europe. Some of Candico's clients are:
ITC
Nestlé 
Nutrine
HUL
Poundland

Distribution

Indian distribution
24 depots, 1500 authorised dealers and a 250 strong sales force.

An Advanced Management Information System ensures that the company’s management has, by 11 a.m. the next day, details of Candico products sold to every shop by every salesman in India.

International distribution
Candico is the only Indian confectionery company with production facilities overseas. Candico’s international operations gathered speed in October 2003 with its acquisition of an equity skate in SML, Tanzania.

In May 2004 it entered into a distribution agreement to set up operations in South Africa.

Candico has set up distribution arrangements in countries across the world including South Africa, New Zealand, Madagascar and Qatar.

Candico is scouting for opportunities to set up distribution agreements in West and North Africa so as to cover the entire African continent.

Joint ventures
Sancorp Eurobase is a joint venture between the Sancorp group and the Eurobase Company, Belgium. Eurobase is an independent gum base producer.

Sancorp Eurobase 
The Sancorp Eurobase joint venture was formed to bring Eurobase's technical skills into India and provide the Eurobase company with an alternate low cost manufacturing base. Despite representations in most major countries, Sancorp Eurobase remains the only gum base factory operating on foreign shores without the direct managerial control of Eurobase. Sancorp Eurobase gets technical advice and expertise from Eurobase International N.V, Belgium. A full-fledged pilot plant is available for production trail and finalization of the base.

Sancorp Eurobase provides gum base to Indian, SAARC and African companies.

Sancorp is associated with Curt Georgi Company, Germany.
 
Curt Georgi started the production of essential oils and colours in 1875 and members of his family continue to run the company today. 
Sancorp Curt Georgi:

The Sancorp Curt Georgi association was formed to bring the technical skills of Curt Georgi into India so that confectionery companies in India could have access to flavors and fragrances.

At present, Sancorp Curt Georgi provides flavors to Indian companies and processes export orders for the SAARC and African markets.

Retail
Candico has entered organized retail. According to an IMAGES-KSA Technopak study, organized retailing in India is projected to grow at the rate of 25%-30% p.a. and is estimated to reach Rs. 1000 billion by 2010.

ORG MARG pegs the organized sector of the confectionery market at Rs. 1400 crore, growing at 9% per annum.

Retail plans
The company plans to open 20 specialty confectionery stores by end 2005, and 200 stores by 2010. The retail chain initiative by Candico involves a total investment of Rs. 30 crore for 200 retail stores across India by 2010. Candico plans to open confectionery stores in South Africa.

Confectionery companies of India
Food and drink companies based in Delhi
Manufacturing companies based in Delhi